Antican may refer to:

 Antican (Star Trek), a fictional race in the Star Trek series
 Antican, a fictional race in the video game Final Fantasy XI